In 1975 the Japanese government added a new chapter to the Law for the Protection of Cultural Properties (1950) to provide for "traditional techniques or craftsmanship that are indispensable to the preservation of cultural property and for which preservation measures shall be taken". Preservation techniques are selected in relation to both tangible and intangible cultural properties and a holder or preservation body is recognized for each technique.

Recognition is thus made and measures taken to combat some of the most serious conservation issues, namely the lack of specialist craftsmen, the loss of knowledge of traditional techniques, and the availability of suitable tools and materials. These issues are of particular relevance in Japan due to the sophistication and inherent susceptibility of much of its art and architecture.

The list below is compiled from the database of cultural properties maintained by the Agency for Cultural Affairs, with translations, glosses and listed holders (as of 2004) following those published by the Asia/Pacific Cultural Centre for UNESCO (ACCU).

Selected Conservation Techniques

Tangible Cultural Properties
43 techniques

Intangible Cultural Properties
31 techniques

See also
 Cultural Properties of Japan
 Intangible Cultural Properties of Japan
 Conservation-restoration

References

External links
  Cultural Properties database
  Association for the Conservation of National Treasures
  Association for the Conservation of National Treasures
  Conservation and Repair Projects: systems and planning

Japanese culture
Important Cultural Properties of Japan
Conservation and restoration of cultural heritage